Kampong Bukit Panggal is a village in Tutong District, Brunei, about  from the district town Pekan Tutong. The population was 801 in 2016. It is one of the villages within Mukim Keriam, a mukim in the district.

Facilities 
The village primary school is Bukit Panggal Primary School. It also shares grounds with Bukit Panggal Religious School, the village school for the country's Islamic religious primary education.

The village mosque is Ar-Rahim Mosque. It was inaugurated on 17 May 2019 by Sultan Hassanal Bolkiah and can accommodate about 800 to 1000 worshippers. It replaced the former Kampong Bukit Panggal Mosque which had been closed since 2017; it had become unsafe for use due to structural issues. The former mosque was built in 1995 and accommodated 250 worshippers.

References 

Bukit Panggal